Road to Düsseldorf（直通杜塞尔多夫）is a qualifying competition in China national table tennis team in order to test and select players to participate the 2017 World Table Tennis Championships held by Düsseldorf, Germany in May 2017.

Men's team

Entrants 
 Players who have won enough world champions on singles events can bye to the third round.
 Players who lack of enough world champion on singles events or missed the first round because of participating the Hungarian Open can bye to the second round.
 Other first team players must compete in the first round.

First round 
Duration: 18–21 January
Formation: Round robin; Best of five; Top 6 qualify to the second round.

Second round 
Duration: 8–11 February
Formation: Round robin; Best of three; Top 8 and 2 resurrected players coaches determine qualify to the third round. Top of the rest players will be the alternate of the third round.

Third round 
Duration: 3–10 March
Formation: Round robin for the first stage, groups and round robin for the second stage; Best of three; The first stage include top 10 of the second round, Ma Long and Zhang Jike, the winner qualify to Düsseldorf; The second stage include the rest 11 players and the alternate, they will be divided into 6 pairs, and each pair winner play the round robin to get the last one quota to Düsseldorf.

First stage

Second stage

Group A knockout

Group B knockout

Group C knockout

Final round robin

Women's team

Entrants 
 Players who are widely considered as the main force can bye to the third round.
 Other first team players who was born after 1993 must compete in the first round.
 Players before 1993 bye to the second round.
 Players who ranked 7 - 8 in the first round will wait for the repechage, compete with the third place of the second round. The final rank of the repechage will be the order of alternates in the third round.

First round 
Date: 10–13 January
Formation: Round robin; Best of five; Top 6 qualify to the third round, players ranked 7 - 8 wait for the repechage.

Second round 
Date: 11 February
Formation: Round robin; Best of five; Top 2 qualify to the third round, and the third rank player wait for the repechage.

Repechage 
Date: 13 February
Formation: Round robin; Best of five; The final rank of the repechage will be the order of alternates in the third round.

Third round 
Duration: 3–10 March
Formation: Round robin for the first stage, groups and round robin for the second stage; Best of three; The first stage include qualified player, Ding Ning, Liu Shiwen, Zhu Yuling and Wu Yang, the winner qualify to Düsseldorf; The second stage include the rest 11 players and the alternate, they will be divided into 6 pairs, and each pair winner play the round robin to get the last one quota to Düsseldorf.

First stage

Second stage

Group A knockout

Group B knockout

Group C knockout

Final round robin

Notes:
(C)=Chopping style.
(P)=Penhold grip.
(A)=Alternate player.
GW=Game won.
GL=Game lost.
DNP=Did not play.

Table tennis competitions in China